The Flying Swan is a 1965 British TV series starring Margaret Lockwood and her daughter Julia.

It ran for 24 episodes on the BBC. The theme music for the series was composed by Ron Grainer.

Plot
A widow runs a guest house.

References

External links

1965 British television series debuts
1960s British television series